Davy Crockett is a biography of the American folk hero written for children by Constance Rourke. It was first published in 1934 and was a Newbery Honor recipient in 1935. It includes detailed explanations of frontier life and many contemporary folk tales about Crockett, plus a very extensive bibliography.

References

1934 children's books
American children's books
American biographies
Children's history books
Cultural depictions of Davy Crockett
Newbery Honor-winning works